Fatehpur is a city in the Sikar district of Indian state Rajasthan. It is part of the Shekhawati region. It is midway between Sikar city and Bikaner on National Highway 52.
It is also the land to Havelis built by Marwari Seth's. It also has many Kuldevi Temples of the Agarwal community for Bajoria,Bindal, Saraf, Chamadia, Choudhary, Goenka, Singhania, Saraogi, Bhartia Families. It is famous for it's extreme weather conditions throughout the year. In winters, the minimum temperature falls below 0° Celsius at night for many days making it the coldest town in India in non mountainous region. In summer the temperature rises to 50° Celsius in the afternoon making it one of the hottest places in India. 1985 Bollywood film Ghulami starting Dharmendra, Naseeruddin Shah, Mithun Chakraborty and Smita Patil was extensively shot here in many of it's havelis and the railway station.

Fatehpur Shekhawati Station

Fatehpur Shekhawati Railway station is in Sikar district making it an important railway station in the Indian state of Rajasthan. The station code name of Fatehpur Shekhawati is ‘FPS’. As part of one of the busiest and populated Indian states, Rajasthan, the Fatehpur Shekhawati railway station is known amongst the top hundred train ticket booking and train traveling stations of the Indian Railway. The total number of trains that pass through Fatehpur Shekhawati (FPS) junction is 20.

History
Fatehpur was established by Fateh Khan Kayamkhani in 1449. Shekhawats later defeated Kayamkhanis and took over Fatehpur and other areas from them. It is also said that Rao Fateh Singh, the then Rao of Sikar founded Fatehpur in 1515. I After it remained under them till Independence.
It is also a location of battle with Maratha invaders in 1799 called the Battle of Fatehpur. Fought between the Maratha Kingdom of Gwalior supported by General George Thomas and the Rajput Kingdom of Jaipur under Sawai Pratap Singh and Rora Ram Ji Khawas, which resulted in a decisive Jaipur victory.

Geography
It has an average elevation of 324 metres (1066 ft). It is home to very rare Jojoba farm.

Behlim Kingdom 1922

Behlim Kingdom is a Heritage Haveli built in the year 1922 by the legendary, Haji Deen Mohammad Behlim, one of the prominent figures of the region.

Qureshi Farm 
The livestock farm was constructed in October 2011 and was officially inaugurated by the local MLA Bhanwaru Khan and Senior Yaqub Haji on 30 April 2012. The project 'Empower rural India through Goat farming via social media' landed the owner Akbar Khan Qureshi as the Top 3 humanitarian projects worldwide by Nations United. The farm conducts research on breed development and maintains pedigree of Indian goats and camels.

Nadine Cultural Centre 

A haveli was purchased in 1998 by French artist Nadine a descendant of prestigious French painter Jean-Baptiste Le Prince. The "Nand Lal Devra Haveli" (meaning "The Haveli of Nandlal Devra": Nandlal Devra is the name of the merchant who constructed the haveli) was originally built in 1802 by a rich family of traders, the Devras, who were officers at the court of the local Maharaja. Since then, Nadine Le Prince has entirely restored the palace and all the frescoes. She is doing much to preserve and restore the heritage of havelis throughout Shekhawati, working with other associations to give the havelis a second life.

Besides, she has opened a cultural center where her most precious paintings are exhibited along with many French and Indian modern artists' works to mingle old and contemporary art. The Kala Dirga Gallery of Contemporary Art features pieces made by artists about India; the Saraswati Gallery covers traditional themes of Rajasthan, through painting. In addition, there are two little Tribal Art Galleries exhibiting the artistic work of tribes, as Patachitras and Madhubani. The aim of the project is to offer the visitor a large panorama of works and visions of India; the exhibited artists and art are from France, from Jaipur Fine Art School and local Shekhawati painters.

Le Prince has established a program of artists in residence and plans to organize other cultural events, such as dance and music shows, to make this enchanting palace become a lively place for art in all forms.

Dwarkadheesh Temple
The Dwarkadheesh Temple popularly known as 'Asharam Temple' was built in the 19th century by the sons of Seth Asharam Ji Poddar in memory of their father. The murals of this temple are representative of the famous Shekhawati wall paintings also known as 'Open Air Art Gallery'.

Jagannath Lohia Haveli
The Jagannath Lohia Haveli was constructed from 1857 to 1860. It's 50 feet tall and has some fine paintings of Radha and Krishna and shows some British men holding guns. 
 It has a special nine-door room on the terrace which is open from all sides. There is air circulation from all sides and thus it remains cool naturally.
 Baithak: It has five doors which are exclusive to this haveli. Other baithaks in the region have three doors.
 Bara dari: A baradari, in Persian and Moghul architecture, is a building or room with 12 doors designed to allow the free draught of air. Persons of repute used it as a venue for formal and informal settings in hot weather. It is also known as the ‘mehfil’ room. The men would occupy the base area. There is an exclusive provision made for the women to sit upstairs in privacy.
 Rangeen Kamra: It is known as the colourful room. The specialty of this room is that it acts as a secret chamber. The floors, walls as well as the ceilings are hand-painted depicting stories based on the life of Lord Krishna.
 Bhuran: It is also known as the underground safety room. It acts like a safe deposit valve which is closed from all sides.

The haveli has Naal on one side and Nohra on the other, which can be used as open space for parking, swimming pool and is large enough to construct the two together.
The Lohia's are now spread in various cities of India as well as Nepal.

Saraf Haveli

This haveli was built around 200 years ago. It is a destination for tourists visiting Fatehpur Shekhawati. The walls are decorated with original mural oil paintings. Its wooden doors are aesthetically crafted.

Sitaram Kedia Ki Haveli
This haveli was constructed by Seth Shree Bohitram Kedia, grandfather of the late Sitaram Kedia. Rajendra Kumar Kedia is an eminent author and book lover. He and his son Anurag Kedia are the current owners.

The haveli has two chawnks or courtyards a garden with fountain at back and Naals on both sides; the wall paintings are traditional. It has a library and modern baths. It was first haveli in Fatehpur to have electricity (via generators) and called Bijliwali Haveli. In 1931 AD Sitaram Kedia was married to the daughter of Bajaj family of Bisau. On this occasion Rao Raja Maharaj Shri Kalyan Singh Ji Bahadur of Sikar Thikana came to bless the couple. Seth Shree Bohitram Kedia brought an aeroplane (popularly called 'Cheel Gadi' or eagle craft) to scatter invitations printed on handkerchiefs for all and flower petals on His Royal Highness. Pleased with the courtesy and respect His Royal Highness granted the family of Seth Shree Bohitram Kedia permission was given to wear gold ornaments below their waist (a privilege that only royals enjoyed in that era).

Although most rooms are locked one can visit the haveli free of any charge, courtesy the Kedia family: Sitaram Kedia Ki Haveli, opposite Poddar Girls School, near Roadways bus stand, Fatehpur Shekhawati, Rajasthan.

Goenka Haveli

The Mahaveer Prasad Goenka Haveli Fatehpur established in 1870 is one of the best havelis in Fatehpur. The frescos and murals at the haveli are reflective of the craftsmanship that flourished in the area.
The Goenkas were and still are affluent businessmen. Their haveli is one of the best to be seen in the Shekhawati Region. The havelis in Rajasthan in general and the havelis in Shekhawati in particular are famous for their colorful frescos. These havelis were owned by rich traders, for whom the havelis for most part served as symbols of status. However, the families then also used to be huge and anything less than a mansion in terms of size, would have been hard put to accommodate a family.

Moreover, business was also usually collectively owned by the members of the family- brothers or kins. The sharing of the sources of income led to the sharing of the same roof and more.

Description :

The Mahaveer Prasad Goenka Haveli Fatehpur In India has excellent paintings on the walls. Many of the paintings depict Lord Krishna's pastimes- his flirtations with the gopinis, his romance with Radha, are some of the most commonly seen. Lord Krishna happened to be an interesting and common subject for frescos all over Rajasthan, considering the popularity of the god in the region.

The main highlight of the Mahaveer Prasad Goenka Haveli In Fatehpur Rajasthan is the painted ceiling in an upstairs room. The Mahaveer Prasad Goenka Haveli Fatehpur Rajasthan can be reached by taking the main road north from the bus stand, and then turning left at the main intersection. The house to the left of the Mahaveer Prasad Goenka Haveli Fatehpur also has nice mirror work another common feature when it comes to discussing fresco art in Rajasthan.

Again, like most havelis in Shekhawati, the Mahaveer Prasad Goenka Haveli Fatehpur opens with a massive carved wooden gate. The gate opens into an outer courtyard. This outer courtyard then leads to a smaller inner courtyard. The havelis in Rajasthan are built around an elaborate network of courtyards. The bigger the Haveli, the larger number of courtyards it would have and the more particular they would be to preserve the sanctity of the women of the family- prohibiting them from having a glance of the outer world.

Jainism in Fatehpur
The Kashthasangh sect of Jainism continued to be practiced in Fatehpur among the Agrwals during the Kayam Khani rule, as attested by inscriptions of  Samvat 1685, 1739, and then during the Shekhawat rule in  sam. 1861.

References

External links
Fatehpur
Ramgarh Shekhawati

Cities and towns in Sikar district
Shekhawati
Tourist attractions in Sikar district